Frida Maria Boisen, (born 25 September 1974) is a Swedish journalist and author.

Early life 
On 25 September 1974, Boisen was born in Säbrå, Sweden.

Boisen studied journalism at Gothenburg University.

Career 
Boisen is a columnist for Expressen newspaper. She has previously been the editor-in-chief for Göteborgs-Tidningen. She has also been the social media strategist for Dagens Industri.

In October 2015, Boisen became the digital editor-in-chief for Bonnier Tidskrifer.

In late 2015, her book Digital succé - så lyckas du med sociala medier was published by Bokförlaget Forum. In 2014 she won the award Best use of Social Media på INMA Awards.

Boisen worked at Göteborgs-Posten between 1997 and 2001. In 2001 she was a guest debater, and columnist at Nyhetsmorgon at TV4, the panel at SVTs morningshow Gomorron Sverige and TV3s Tillsammans.

In 2006, she became the editor-in-chief of the fashion magazine Plaza Kvinna.

In 2018, Boisen is the author of Digital Passion.

References

External links

Swedish women writers
Swedish journalists
Living people
1974 births